Rolando Hourruitiner (born May 28, 1975) is a business professional and entrepreneur; focusing mainly in sports & entertainment, media, digital, mobile and hospitality. Hourruitiner is a former basketball player, coach and sports agent with extensive international exposure. He has also been featured as a basketball TV commentator and analyst in Puerto Rico.

Rolando was a member of the Puerto Rico Basketball National Team from 1995 until 2004, including been a key player of the 2004 team that defeated the United States Basketball National Team at the 2004 Olympic Games in Athens, Greece. He also competed in PanAm Games, Goodwill Games and FIBA World Cup.

Hourruitiner graduated from Charleston Southern University in Charleston, SC, in 1998. He was co-captain of the 1996-1997 CSU Buccaneers NCAA Division 1 basketball team that won the NCAA Big South Conference championship and went on to the 1997 NCAA basketball tournament. It was the first time for Charleston Southern University Basketball to compete in the National Tournament... To this day, it's still the only CSU Bucs team to make it.

In October, 2015, Rolando was inducted into the Sports Hall of Fame of his hometown Caguas, Puerto Rico (Pabellón de la Fama del Deporte Cagüeño). He was honored and recognized for his years of continued success as a basketball player, coach and executive, including his 10 years (1995-2004) as a member of the Puerto Rico Basketball National Team.

References

External links
 Baloncesto Superior Nacional profile

1975 births
Living people
1998 FIBA World Championship players
2002 FIBA World Championship players
Baloncesto Superior Nacional players
Basketball players at the 1999 Pan American Games
Charleston Southern Buccaneers men's basketball players
Competitors at the 1998 Goodwill Games
Goodwill Games medalists in basketball
Leones de Ponce basketball players
Medalists at the 1999 Pan American Games
Pan American Games bronze medalists for Puerto Rico
Pan American Games medalists in basketball
Puerto Rican businesspeople
Puerto Rican men's basketball players
Puerto Rico men's national basketball team players
Sportspeople from San Juan, Puerto Rico